EBN may refer to:

 East by north
 Eastbourne railway station, a railway station in Sussex, England
 Edible bird's nest
 Emergency Broadcast Network, an American multimedia performance group
 Energie Beheer Nederland, a Dutch natural gas company
 European Business News, now CNBC Europe, a television channel
 Evidence-Based Nursing
 Evidence-Based Nursing (journal)
 Stephan Ebn (born 1978), German musician